Mohamed Sheikh Osman was a prominent Somali politician and Member of Parliament in the civilian government. He held numerous ministerial positions in the later non-civilian regime, including the position of Minister of Finance, which he held from 1984 to 1987, and from April 1989 to February 1990.

His son, Jibril Sheikh Osman, now holds political positions in the Somali government. One such position he has held is a Counselor for the Somali Ambassador for Ethiopia.

He died in December 2005.

References

2005 deaths
Finance ministers of Somalia
Government ministers of Somalia
Year of birth missing